Emperor Huai of Jin (284 – March 14, 313), personal name Sima Chi (司馬熾), courtesy name Fengdu (豐度), was an emperor of the Jin Dynasty (266–420).

Emperor Huai was captured in 311 and later executed in 313 under the order of Liu Cong, ruler of the Xiongnu state of Han Zhao.

As Prince of Yuzhang and crown prince
Sima Chi was one of the youngest sons of Sima Yan, the founding emperor of Jin, by his concubine Consort Wang.  Just prior to Emperor Wu's death in May 290, he was created the Prince of Yuzhang on 22 December 289.  During the early stages of the War of the Eight Princes during his developmentally disabled brother Sima Zhong's reign, unlike the other princes fighting for power, Prince Chi did not get himself in political or military matters, but spent his time studying history.

In late 304, when Emperor Hui was forcibly taken from the capital Luoyang to Chang'an, then under the control of the regent Sima Yong Prince of Hejian, Prince Chi was forced to accompany the emperor.  In February 305, when his more ambitious brother Sima Ying the crown prince was demoted back to Prince of Chengdu by Sima Yong, Prince Chi was created crown prince to replace him.  He was initially going to decline the honor, believing that his nephew Sima Qin the Prince of Qinghe and one-time crown prince should be returned to that position, but was persuaded to accept by his associate Xiu Su.  Later, after Sima Yue the Prince of Donghai defeated Sima Yong in 306, Crown Prince Chi accompanied Emperor Hui and returned to Luoyang.

In January 307, Emperor Hui was poisoned.  (Most historians believe that Sima Yue ordered the murder, but there is no conclusive evidence.)  Emperor Hui's wife, Yang Xianrong, believing that she would not be honored as empress dowager if her brother-in-law inherited the throne, tried to have Sima Qin declared emperor; she was rebuffed by Sima Yue, however, and Crown Prince Chi succeeded to the throne as Emperor Huai.  Emperor Huai honored her with the title "Empress Hui," but not empress dowager.  He created his wife Crown Princess Liang Lanbi empress.

Reign
Emperor Huai was commonly regarded as an intelligent man, and he tried to institute reforms that he felt would allow the empire to recover from the ravages of the War of the Eight Princes and the subsequent Wu Hu and agrarian uprisings.  However, Sima Yue maintained a tight grip on power and would not allow the emperor to exercise much actual authority.

In spring 307, Emperor Huai created Sima Qin's brother (and therefore fellow son of Emperor Huai's brother Sima Yan the Prince of Wu) Sima Quan crown prince.  (His apparent conclusion, at the young age of 23, that he should make a nephew his heir, may indicate that he considered himself infertile.)

In spring 307, Sima Yue left Luoyang and set up headquarters at Xuchang (許昌, in modern Xuchang, Henan), but continued to control the government remotely.  In 309, Sima Yue, concerned about the growing use of authority that Emperor Huai was exerting, made a sudden return to Luoyang and arrested and executed a number of Emperor Huai's associates, including Emperor Huai's uncle Wang Yan. Other than privately mourning them, there was nothing that Emperor Huai could do. Sima Yue further disbanded the imperial guards and put his own personal forces in charge of protecting the emperor.

For all of Sima Yue's assertion of authority, he could not stop Han Zhao, under its generals Liu Cong the Prince of Chu (the son of Han Zhao's emperor Liu Yuan), Liu Yao the Prince of Shi'an (Liu Yuan's nephew), Wang Mi, and Shi Le, from disrupting Jin rule throughout northern and central China and gradually wearing out Jin forces and capturing Jin cities and towns.  In late 309, he managed to fight off a joint attack by Liu Cong and Wang on Luoyang, but that victory was the exception to Han Zhao's inexorable advances.  After Liu Yuan died in 310 and was succeeded by Liu Cong, Han Zhao renewed its attacks on the Luoyang region.  Meanwhile, Sima Yue continued to alienate other generals and officials, and when Liu Kun, the military commander of Bing (并州, roughly modern Shanxi) proposed to him the plan of an attack on the Han Zhao capital Pingyang (平陽, in modern Linfen, Shanxi) in conjunction with the powerful Xianbei chieftain Tuoba Yilu the Duke of Dai, Sima Yue was fearful of a backstabbing attack by some of these warlords and therefore did not accept Liu's plan.  Indeed, when Emperor Huai and Sima Yue sent out calls for the various governors to come to Luoyang's aid later that year, there were few responses.  Sima Yue became uncertain of himself, and late in 310 left Luoyang with virtually all of the central government's remaining troops, along with a large number of officials, effectively stripping Luoyang and Emperor Huai bare of their defenses, except for a small detachment commanded by Sima Yue's subordinate He Lun, intended as much to monitor as to protect Emperor Huai.  From that point on, Luoyang was left even without a police force and became largely a city abandoned to bandits and thugs.

Emperor Huai soon entered into a plan with Gou Xi (苟晞), the military commander of Qing Province (青州, modern central and eastern Shandong), who had been dissatisfied with Sima Yue, to overthrow Sima Yue's yoke.  Sima Yue discovered this plan, but was unable to wage a campaign against Gou.  He grew ill in his anger and distress, and died in spring 311.  The generals and officials in his army, instead of returning to Luoyang, headed east toward Sima Yue's principality of Donghai (roughly modern Linyi, Shandong) to bury him there.  He Lun, upon hearing about Sima Yue's death, also withdrew from Luoyang and sought to join that force.  However, both were intercepted by Shi Le and wiped out.  Shi, declaring that Sima Yue had caused the empire much damage, burned Sima Yue's body.  Sima Yue's sons were all captured and presumably killed by Shi.

Sima Yue's death, however, only left Emperor Huai even more vulnerable to Han Zhao attacks.  Gou sent a force to welcome Emperor Huai to move the capital to Cangyuan (倉垣, in modern Kaifeng, Henan), and Emperor Huai was going to do so, but his officials all still missed Luoyang and did not want to leave.  Soon, however, the famine that had already overtaken Luoyang got even more severe.  Emperor Huai resolved to head for Cangyuan, but with Gou's force having already left Luoyang, was unable to even leave the palace without being attacked by bandits, and therefore was forced to return to the palace.  In summer 311, knowing that Luoyang was defenseless, the Han Zhao generals Liu Yao, Wang Mi, Shi Le, and Huyan Yan converged on Luoyang, and they easily captured Emperor Huai in what is known as the Disaster of Yongjia.  A large number of Jin nobility was slaughtered, although Emperor Huai was, for the time being, spared and delivered to the Han Zhao capital Pingyang, to be presented to the emperor Liu Cong.  Liu Cong created Emperor Huai the Duke of Ping'a.

After capture by Han Zhao
For one and a half years, the former Jin emperor lived a humiliating existence in the Han Zhao capital.  In 312, Liu Cong promoted him to the title of the Duke of Kuaiji.  Once, after inviting the duke to a feast, Liu Cong commented on a meeting they had while the former emperor was still the Prince of Yuzhang, leading to a notable colloquy.  Liu Cong first stated,

When you were the Prince of Yuzhang, I had once visited you with Wang Ji (王濟).  Wang praised me, and you said, "I have long heard of your fame."  You showed me the music that you had written, and then asked me and Wang to write lyrics for them. We wrote lyrics praising you, and you liked them.  Then, we spent some time shooting arrows; I hit the target 12 times, and both you and Wang hit nine times.  You gave me gifts of a mulberry bow and a silver inkstone.  Do you still remember?

The duke responded, "How can I forget?  What I regret is not realizing that I was in the presence of a dragon."  Liu Cong, impressed by the flattery, then asked, "How is it that your clan members slaughtered each other?"  The duke replied:

This is not a human matter, but was the will of Heaven.  The great Han was going to receive divine favor, so our clan eliminated itself for Han.  If our clan members could follow the directives of Emperor Wu and remain united, how could Your Imperial Majesty become emperor?

Liu Cong was impressed, and they spent all night talking.  The next day, Liu Cong gave one of his favorite concubines to the duke as a gift, creating her as the Duchess of Kuaiji.

In 313, however, the former emperor would suffer his death.  At the imperial new year celebration, Liu Cong ordered him to serve the high level officials wine, and former Jin officials Yu Min and Wang Juan could not control their emotions at seeing his humiliation, and cried out loud.  This made Liu Cong angry, and he falsely accused Yu and Wang, along with a number of former Jin officials, of being ready to betray Pingyang and offer it to the Jin general Liu Kun.  He then executed those former Jin officials and poisoned the former emperor.

Era name
Yongjia (永嘉 Yǒngjiā) 307–313

Family
Consorts:
 Empress, of the Liang clan of Anding, personal name Lanbi
 Lady, of the Liu clan

Ancestry

References

 Fang, Xuanling. Book of Jin (Jin Shu).

284 births
313 deaths
Jin dynasty (266–420) emperors
4th-century Chinese monarchs
Monarchs taken prisoner in wartime
Emperors from Luoyang
Executed Former Zhao people
People executed by Former Zhao
4th-century executions
Executed people from Henan
Murdered Chinese emperors
Heads of government who were later imprisoned